The Gawkadal massacre was named after the Gawkadal bridge in Srinagar, Jammu and Kashmir, India, where, on 21 January 1990, the Indian paramilitary troops of the Central Reserve Police Force opened fire on a group of Kashmiri protesters in what has been described by some authors as "the worst massacre in Kashmiri history". At least 50 people were killed.
According to survivors, the actual death toll may have been as high as 280.
The massacre happened two days after the Government of India appointed Jagmohan as the Governor for a second time in a bid to control the mass protests by Kashmiris.

Background
January 1990 was a major turning point for the Kashmir insurgency as well as the Indian government's handling of it. By this time, the Kashmir insurgency was one-and-a-half year old, having been launched by the Pakistan-based Jammu Kashmir Liberation Front (JKLF) in July 1988 under Pakistani sponsorship. However, pro-Independence JKLF was not in Pakistan's interest.  By October 1989, its secret service ISI, working with the Jamaat-e-Islami Azad Kashmir, brought together some of the key Islamist insurgent groups working in Kashmir under the banner of Hizbul Mujahideen. In a key meeting in Kathmandu on 14 January 1990, Jamaat-e-Islami Kashmir was persuaded to take control of Hizbul Mujahideen. Henceforth, the Kashmir insurgency was to run along an Islamist paradigm. An often-heard slogan was "Azadi ka matlab kya, La Ilahi lilillah [illallah]" ("What is the meaning of freedom? It is Islamic State").

Concurrent to these developments, the Indian central government was going through a crisis. Rajiv Gandhi lost the general election held in 1989, and a minority government led by opposition Janata Dal under V. P. Singh took power, with external support from the Bharatiya Janata Party. Singh appointed a Kashmiri politician Mufti Muhammad Sayeed as the Home Minister. A week later, on 8 December 1989, the JKLF kidnapped his daughter Rubaiya Sayeed, demanding the release of jailed JKLF militants in return for her release. The government's capitulation to this demand strengthened the image of JKLF and gave a fillip to its azadi (freedom) movement, while at the same time undercutting the authority of the state government led by Farooq Abdullah.

Following these events, the Indian government decided to replace the Governor K. V. Krishna Rao. Under the pressure of the Bharatiya Janata Party, the V. P. Singh government in Delhi, chose Jagmohan to succeed him. Jagmohan had served a previous term as the Governor in the State, during which the Chief Minister Farooq Abdullah was dismissed. Abdullah had held it against Jagmohan, and resigned from Chief Ministership when he heard the news.
The state went under Governor's rule.

Events

19 January 
On the night 19 January 1990 (or the early morning of 20 January), Indian security forces conducted extensive house-to-house searches in Srinagar, in an effort to find illegal weapons and root out any hidden militants.
Three hundred people were arrested, most of whom were later released. Both Jagmohan and Abdullah deny any involvement in the decision to carry out the raid. According to Manoj Joshi, the search was ordered by the police chiefs.

The night of 19 January also saw the initiation of a mass revolt in the Kashmir valley. Various reports indicate that Kashmiri Muslims were out on the streets shouting anti-India, pro-Pakistan and Islamic slogans. Mosques crackled with loud speakers, issuing slogans and playing pre-recorded messages.
India Today described the mood in the Valley as one of open defiance: "mobs challenged the gun, defying policemen to fire at them". They chanted slogans, "Indian dogs go back" and "Azadi ka matlab kya, La Ilahi lilillah [illallah]" ("What is freedom, Allah is the only god").

20 January 
As word of the raids spread on 20 January 1990, crowds gathered outside the Divisional Commissioner's office in Srinagar to protest the 'atrocities', and were tear-gassed.
Organisers fanned out through the city and massive processions were initiated by the evening.
A curfew was imposed by night fall.

21 January 
On the evening of 21 January, a large group of protesters shouting pro-independence slogans, reached Srinagar's wooden Gawkadal Bridge. According to the J & K police, on approaching the wooden bridge a large crowd of demonstrators started pelting stones, after which the security forces fired on the crowd, leading to the death of several protestors. The police record mentions that "on January 21, a big crowd raising anti-India slogans was heading towards Lal Chowk and the security forces tried to stop the crowd near Gawkadal. Instead of dispersing, the unruly crowd started pelting stones at government buildings and security force personnel."

Indian authorities put the official death toll for the massacre at 28. International human rights organisations and scholars estimate that at least 50, and likely over 100 protesters were killed—some by gunshot wounds, other by drowning after they jumped into the river in fear.

Aftermath
In the aftermath of the massacre, more demonstrations followed, and in January 1990, Indian paramilitary forces are believed to have killed around 300 protesters. As a Human Rights Watch stated in a report from May, 1991, "In the weeks that followed [the Gawkadal massacre] as security forces fired on crowds of marchers and as militants intensified their attacks against the police and those suspected of aiding them, Kashmir’s civil war began in earnest." MJ Akbar, editor of Asian Age newspaper, said of the massacre, "January 19 became the catalyst which propelled into a mass upsurge. Young men from hundreds of homes crossed over into Pakistan administered Kashmir to receive arms and training in insurrection Pakistan came out in open support of secession, and for the first time, did not need to involve its regular troops in the confrontation. In Srinagar, each mosque became a citadel of fervor."

No known action was ever taken against the CRPF forces officials responsible for the massacre, or against the officers present at Gawkadal that night.  No government investigation was ever ordered into the incident. Fifteen years later, the police case was closed and those involved in the massacre were declared untraceable. No challan has been produced against any person in court.

See also
 Zakoora and Tengpora massacre
 Sopore massacre
 Handwara massacre
 Bijbehara massacre
 Human rights abuses in Jammu and Kashmir

Notes

References

 Sources
 
 
 
 
 

Conflicts in 1990
January 1990 events in Asia
1990s in Jammu and Kashmir
Political repression in India
Massacres in 1990
Military scandals
Srinagar
1990 in India
Massacres in Jammu and Kashmir
Massacres committed by India